The 36th Young Artist Awards ceremony, presented by the Young Artist Association, honored excellence of young performers between the ages of 5 to 21 in the fields of film, television, theatre and the internet for the 2014 calendar year. Winners were announced on May 15, 2015, at the annual ceremony and banquet luncheon held in the Empire Ballroom of the Sportsmen's Lodge in Studio City, California.

Categories 
★ Winners were announced on May 15, 2015.

Best Performance in a Feature Film

Best Performance in a Feature Film – Leading Young Actor 
★ Reese Hartwig — Earth to Echo — Panay Films
 Nathan Gamble — Dolphin Tale 2 — Alcon Entertainment
 Ed Oxenbould — Alexander and the Terrible, Horrible, No Good, Very Bad Day — Walt Disney Pictures

Best Performance in a Feature Film – Leading Young Actress 
★ Quvenzhané Wallis — Annie — Marcy Media
 Elle Fanning — Maleficent — Walt Disney Pictures
 Cozi Zuehlsdorff — Dolphin Tale 2 — Alcon Entertainment

Best Performance in a Feature Film – Supporting Young Actor 
★ John Paul Ruttan — RoboCop — Columbia Pictures
 Carson Bolde — Godzilla — Warner Brothers
 Max Charles — The Amazing Spider-Man 2 — Columbia Pictures
 Daniel Huttlestone — Into the Woods — Walt Disney Studios
 Aidan McGraw — American Sniper — Warner Brothers

Best Performance in a Feature Film – Supporting Young Actress 
★ Lilla Crawford — Into the Woods — Walt Disney Studios
 Mackenzie Foy — Interstellar — Paramount Pictures
 Emma Fuhrmann — Blended — Warner Brothers
 Madeleine McGraw — American Sniper — Warner Brothers

Best Performance in a Feature Film – Young Ensemble Cast 
★ Braxton Beckham, Emma Fuhrmann, Alyvia Alyn Lind, Kyle Red Silverstein, Bella Thorne — Blended — Warner Brothers
 Kerris Dorsey, Dylan Minnette, Ed Oxenbould — Alexander and the Terrible, Horrible, No Good, Very Bad Day — Walt Disney Pictures

Best Performance in a Short Film

Best Performance in a Short Film – Young Actor 
★ Christian Hutcherson — And Then We Laugh — Vlaptkin Productions
 Connor Beardmore — In Need of Caffeine — VBC
 Peter Bundic — The Dating Journal — L.O.T.G Productions
 Jadon Clews — Kemosabe — Ryerson Films
 Joshua Costea — The Dating Journal — L.O.T.G Productions

Best Performance in a Short Film – Young Actress 
★ Katelyn Mager — Discovered — L.O.T.G Productions
★ Sofie Uretsky — Clinch — Sheridan Films
 Janette Bundic — The Dating Journal — L.O.T.G Productions
 Jeri Leader — The Spiked Watermelon — York University
 Abigail Wolff — The Watchers: The Darkness Outside — Highly Sober Productions

Best Performance in a Short Film – Young Actor 10 and Under 
★ Blaze Tucker — Make It Rain — Meza Multimedia
 Devan Cohen — Behind the Door — York Films
 Richard Davis — Brothers — Sheridan Films
 Joshua Kaufman — Steel — Triserratops Productions
 David Raynolds — Albert — Joreel Productions
 Jonah Wineberg — Family Business — York University

Best Performance in a Short Film – Young Actress 10 and Under 
★ Emily Delahunty — My Mom is an Alien — Independent
 Carla Costea — Molly – Young Movie Makers
 Maia Costea — The Battle — Joreel Productions
 Alyssa Cross — When Fish Fly — Organic Water Productions
 Peyton Kennedy — Dorsal — Ryerson Image Artists
 Madeline Lupi — Milkshake — Cinema Kography
 Isabella Piombini — At the Doctor's — Tarlington Films
 Cadence Schuster — Florence and the Fish — York Films
 Katie Silverman — Raw Head + Bloody Bones — Mer-Made Productions

Best Performance in a TV Movie, Miniseries, Special or Pilot

Best Performance in a TV Movie, Miniseries, Special or Pilot – Young Actor 
★ Samuel Patrick Chu — Zapped — Disney Channel
 Joey Luthman — Finders Keepers — SyFy
 Donnie MacNeil — Zapped — Disney Channel
 Christian Martyn — The Christmas Parade — Hallmark
 Ty Parker — Mt. Happy — ABC

Best Performance in a TV Movie, Miniseries, Special or Pilot – Young Actress 
★ Emilia McCarthy — Zapped — Disney Channel
 Olivia Steele-Falconer — The Tree That Saved Christmas — Up TV Network
 Jennifer Jolliff — It Only Happens with Rose — Moe Entertainment
 Jordyn Ashley Olson — The Christmas Shepherd — Hallmark
 Tiera Skovbye — The Unauthorized Saved by the Bell Story — Lifetime

Best Performance in a TV Movie, Miniseries, Special or Pilot – Young Actor 13 and Under 
★ 'Darien Provost — The Town That Came A-Courtin — Up TV Network
 John Alyn — Peter Pan Live! — NBC
 Jake Lucas — Peter Pan Live! — NBC
 Valin Shinyei — Along Came a Nanny — Hallmark

Best Performance in a TV Movie, Miniseries, Special or Pilot – Young Actress 11 and Under 
★ Sydney Mikayla — The Gabby Douglas Story  — Lifetime
 Jaeda Lily Miller — The Christmas Secret — Hallmark
 Gracyn Shinyei — A Cookie Cutter Christmas — Hallmark
 Jena Skodje — Along Came a Nanny — Hallmark
 Alissa Skovbye — One Christmas Eve — Hallmark

Best Performance in a TV Series

Best Performance in a TV Series – Leading Young Actor 
★ Kolton Stewart — Some Assembly Required — YTV
★ Benjamin Stockham — About A Boy — NBC
 Max Burkholder — Parenthood — NBC
 Lyle Lettau — Degrassi: The Next Generation — CTV

Best Performance in a TV Series – Leading Young Actress 
★ Paris Smith — Every Witch Way — Nickelodeon
 Dalila Bela — Odd Squad — PBS
 Millie Davis — Odd Squad — PBS
 Addison Holley — Annedroids — Amazon
 Emilia McCarthy — Max & Shred — Nickelodeon

Best Performance in a TV Series – Supporting Young Actor 
★ Evan & Ryder Londo — Sons of Anarchy — FX
★ Eric Osborne — Degrassi: The Next Generation — CTV
 Miles Brown — Black-ish — ABC
 Pierce Gagnon — Extant — CBS
 Keidrich Sellati — The Americans — FX

Best Performance in a TV Series – Supporting Young Actress 
★ Holly Taylor — The Americans — FX
 Adrianna Di Liello — Annedroids — Amazon
 Marsai Martin — Black-ish — ABC
 Savannah Paige Rae — Parenthood — NBC

Best Performance in a TV Series – Guest Starring Young Actor 15-21 
★ Joey Luthman — The Goldbergs — ABC
 Nicholas Azarian — The McCarthys — CBS
 Samuel Patrick Chu — R.L. Stine's The Haunting Hour — The Hub Network
 Jake Elliott — Ray Donovan — Showtime
 Dalton E. Gray — American Horror Story — FX
 Zachary Mitchell — Girl Meets World — Disney Channel

Best Performance in a TV Series – Guest Starring Young Actress 17-21 
★ Zoé De Grand Maison — Motive — CTV
 Laine MacNeil — Strange Empire — CBC
 Chanel Marriott — Hawaii Five-0 — CBS

Best Performance in a TV Series – Guest Starring Young Actress 14-16 
★ Johnnie Ladd — Melissa & Joey — ABC Family
 Ava Allan — The Middle — ABC
 Katherine Evans — Intruders — BBC America
 Jessica Lonardo — Swamp Murders — ID Channel
 Emily Robinson — Scorpion — CBS

Best Performance in a TV Series – Guest Starring Young Actor 11-14 
★ Rio Mangini — Good Luck Charlie — Disney Channel
 Nick Cuthbertson — Mr. D — CBC
 Justin Ellings — CSI: Crime Scene Investigation — CBS
 John Paul Ruttan — Saving Hope — CTV

Best Performance in a TV Series – Guest Starring Young Actress 11-13 
★ Olivia Steele-Falconer — R.L. Stine's The Haunting Hour — The Hub Network
 Ella Ballentine — Reign — The CW
 Julia Lalonde — Heartland — CBC

Best Performance in a TV Series – Guest Starring Young Actor 10 and Under 
★ Albert Tsai — Benched — USA Network
 Thomas Barbusca — Friends with Better Lives — FOX
 Shannon Brown — Extant — CBS
 Samuel Faraci — Hannibal — Gaumont International Television
 Jack Fulton — Saving Hope — CTV
 Zachary Haven — My Haunted House — Lifetime

Best Performance in a TV Series – Guest Starring Young Actress 10 and Under 
★ Layla Crawford — True Blood — HBO
★ Afra Sophia Tully — Legit — FX
 Michela Luci — Odd Squad — PBS
 Morgan McGarry — The Mysteries of Laura — NBC
 Jaeda Lily Miller — Some Assembly Required — YTV

Best Performance in a TV Series – Recurring Young Actor 17-21 
★ Brock Ciarlelli — The Middle — ABC
 Connor Beardmore — The Killing — FOX
 Daniel Polo — The Bridge — FX
 Richard Walters — Degrassi: The Next Generation — CTV

Best Performance in a TV Series – Recurring Young Actress 17-21 
★ Frédérique Dufort — Unité 9 — Radio Canada TV
 Jaylen Barron — Good Luck Charlie — Disney Channel
 Kiersey Clemons — Transparent — Amazon
 Zoé De Grand Maison — Orphan Black — BBC America
 Kelly Heyer — Raising Hope — FOX

Best Performance in a TV Series – Recurring Young Actor 
★ Sean Michael Kyer — When Calls the Heart — Hallmark
 Jaden Betts — Scandal — ABC
 Brendan Heard — Odd Squad — PBS
 Matt Tolton — Mr. D — CBC
 Robbie Tucker — See Dad Run — Nickelodeon
 Tai Urban — Shameless — Showtime

Best Performance in a TV Series – Recurring Young Actress 14-16 
★ Emily Robinson — Transparent — Amazon
 Brielle Barbusca — Scandal — ABC
 Katherine Evans — The Killing — FOX
 Ally Ioannides — Parenthood — NBC
 Danika Yarosh — Shameless — Showtime

Best Performance in a TV Series – Recurring Young Actress 11-13 
★ Stephanie Katherine Grant — The Goldbergs — ABC
 Lizzie Boys — When Calls the Heart — Hallmark
 Julia Lalonde — Odd Squad — PBS
 Katelyn Mager — When Calls the Heart — Hallmark
 Kassidy Mattera — Mr. D — CBC

Best Performance in a TV Series – Recurring Young Actor 10 and Under 
★ Thomas Barbusca — Grey's Anatomy — ABC
 Christian Distefano — Odd Squad — PBS
 Armani Jackson — Grey's Anatomy — ABC

Best Performance in a TV Series – Recurring Young Actress 10 and Under 
★ Peyton Kennedy — Odd Squad — PBS
★ Mamie Laverock — When Calls the Heart — Hallmark
★ Sunnie Pelant — Bones — FOX
 Siena Agudong — Killer Women — ABC
 Isabella Kai Rice — True Blood — HBO
 Gracyn Shinyei — When Calls the Heart — Hallmark

Outstanding Young Ensemble in a TV Series 
★ Adrianna Di Liello, Jadiel Dowlin, Addison Holley — Annedroids — Amazon
 Rowan Blanchard, Sabrina Carpenter, August Maturo, Peyton Meyer — Girl Meets World — Disney Channel
 Dalila Bela, Millie Davis, Filip Geljo, Sean Michael Kyer — Odd Squad — PBS

Best Performance in a Voice-Over Role

Best Performance in a Voice-Over Role – Young Actor 
★ Stuart Allan — Son of Batman — Warner Brothers Animation
 Jaden Betts — Doc McStuffins — Disney Channel
 Joshua Carlon — Sofia the First — Disney Junior
 Valin Shinyei — Frozen in Time — Cartoon Network
 Alex Thorne — PAW Patrol — Nickelodeon

Best Performance in a Voice-Over Role – Young Actress 
★ Kallan Holley — PAW Patrol — Nickelodeon
 Amariah Faulkner — Creative Galaxy — Amazon
 Bailey Gambertoglio — Bubble Guppies — Nickelodeon
 Sarah Sheppard — Doki — Discovery Kids
 Berkley Silverman — PAW Patrol — Nickelodeon
 Brooke Wolloff — Tumble Leaf — Amazon

Best Performance in a Voice-Over Role – Young Actor 10 and Under 
★ Devan Cohen — PAW Patrol — Nickelodeon
★ Christopher Downs — Tumble Leaf — Amazon
 Max Calinescu — PAW Patrol — Nickelodeon
 Christian Distefano — PAW Patrol — Nickelodeon
 Zac McDowell — Tumble Leaf — Amazon
 Jaxon Mercey — Daniel Tiger's Neighborhood — PBS

Best Performance in a Film for DVD 
★ Mandalynn Carlson — Small Town Santa — Screen Media Films
 Jet Jurgensmeyer — The Little Rascals Save the Day — Universal Pictures Home Entertainment
 John Paul Ruttan — Shelby: The Dog Who Saved Christmas — Anchor Bay Entertainment

Best Web Performance

Best Web Performance – Young Actor 
★ Austin James Wolff — Dead Souls — Independent
 Jack Fulton — Hemlock Grove — Netflix
 William Leon — Camouflage — Project Studios 505
 Zach Louis — Camp Abercorn — Gray Oak Productions

Best Web Performance – Young Actress 
★ Jessica Mikayla Adams — Reel Kids — HD Films
 Sage Boatright — Boozy Mom — Independent
 Isabelle Dubroy — Microchip Jones — Independent
 Elise Luthman — Beachwood Charter — Harrison Productions
 Kayla Servi — Comet — IFC Films
 Shae Smolik — Microchip Jones — Independent

Best Performance in Live Theater

Best Performance in Live Theater – Young Actor 
★ Alexander Davis — A Christmas Story — Neptune Theatre, Halifax
 Robin de Zwart — Chitty Chitty — Island Discovery Theatre, Vancouver
 Graham Verchere — Mary Poppins — Stanley Theatre, Vancouver
 Toby Verchere — The Old Curiosity Shop — Jericho Arts Centre, Vancouver

Best Performance in Live Theater – Young Actress 
★ Lily Killam — Les Misérables — Chemainus Theatre, B.C. Canada
 Alora Killam — My Fair Lady — South Island Musical Theatre, B.C. Canada
 Jeri Leader — Seussical The Musical — Lower Ossington Theatre, Toronto

Special awards

The Maureen Dragone Scholarship Award 
★ Actors For Autism — Opening Doors of Opportunity, Creating Possibilities

Jackie Coogan Award – Contribution to Youth 
★ Nellee Holmes – HFPA — Excellence in Journalism, Celebrating Young Artists

Mickey Rooney Award – Lifetime Achievement 
★  Rider Strong — Shawn Hunter from ABC's "Boy Meets World"

Social Relations of Knowledge Institute Award 
★  Cosmos: A Spacetime Odyssey with Neil deGrasse Tyson — FOX & National Geographic

References

External links 

Young Artist Awards ceremonies
May 2015 events in the United States
2015 in California